Tephritis cardualis is a species of tephritid or fruit flies in the genus Tephritis of the family Tephritidae.

Distribution
Pakistan.

References

Tephritinae
Insects described in 1974
Diptera of Asia